Otto L. Lietchen (October 5, 1887 – April 1977) was an American Democratic politician who served in the Missouri General Assembly.  He served in the Missouri Senate from 1941 until 1949.

Lietchen was educated in public schools and business college and worked as an insurance businessman.  He was also a member of the Board of Aldermen of the City of St. Louis for seven and a half years.

References

External links
 The Political Graveyard: Index to Politicians, Lewisohn to Lifshutz
 Otto Lietchen (1887 - 1977)

1887 births
1977 deaths
20th-century American politicians
Democratic Party Missouri state senators